Pterophorus lamottei is a moth of the family Pterophoridae. It is known from Equatorial Guinea.

References

lamottei
Insects of West Africa
Moths of Africa
Moths described in 1992